The Libertine (Italian: La matriarca, lit. "The matriarch") is a 1968 Italian film directed by Pasquale Festa Campanile.

Plot
This is a sex comedy film about Mimi (Catherine Spaak), a young widow who discovers that her recently deceased husband kept a secret apartment for his kinky desires. Frustrated that he did not explore his sexual fantasies with her, she embarks on a quest to understand perversion and sexuality. She uses her late husband's apartment to seduce various men, each time learning more about the depths of human depravation, as well as the extent of the sexual double standard for women (late in the film, she states, "I notice men only call me a whore when I say no. Or stop saying yes.")

Finally, she meets the man who shares himself fully with her, appreciates her sexual daring and accepts her for whoever she is.

Cast 
 Catherine Spaak as Margherita, aka Mimmi
 Jean-Louis Trintignant as Dr. Carlo De Marchi
 Gigi Proietti as Sandro Maldini
 Luigi Pistilli as Otto Frank, aka Mr. X
 Renzo Montagnani as Fabrizio 
 Fabienne Dali as Claudia
 Nora Ricci as Mimmi's Mother 
 Vittorio Caprioli as The Librarian
 Frank Wolff as Dr. Giulio 
 Edda Ferronao as Maria
 Paolo Stoppa as Professor Zauri
 Philippe Leroy as The Tennis Instructor
 Venantino Venantini as Aurelio
 Gabriele Tinti as The Man in the Car

Reception
The New York Times said the film was "not nearly as clever, sophisticated and amusing as it archly pretends." The Guardian called it "pseudo-sophisticated, so fake as to be positively sick making and, what is more, thoroughly unerotic." The Washington Post complained "the film's own attitudes are far too conventional". The Los Angeles Times thought the movie was "at times... pretty hot stuff... has a little more style and wit than most Radley Metzger releases." The Chicago Tribune thought the film was "more clumsy than clever... just as unimaginative as the film it attempts to parody."

See also 
Sadism and masochism in fiction
Libertine

References

External links

1969 films
1969 comedy films
Commedia all'italiana
Films directed by Pasquale Festa Campanile
Films scored by Armando Trovajoli
Films set in Rome
Films shot in Rome
1960s Italian-language films
1960s Italian films